Nereide was a  in the Italian Royal Navy during World War I. She was built 1911–1913 at the navy yard at Venice and was sunk in 1915 by the Austro-Hungarian submarine  under the command of Georg Ritter von Trapp. Nereides captain, Carlo del Greco posthumously received the Medaglia d'Oro al Valore Militare for his actions when Nereide was sunk.

Design and construction 
The Italian Nautilus was designed by Curio Bernardis, later a well-known submarine designer. Nereides hull, like that of her sister ship , was shaped similar to a torpedo boat. Nereide was armed with two  bow torpedo tubes and could carry up to 4 torpedoes. She was designed for a complement of 19–2 officers and 17 sailors.

Nereide was laid down at the Venice Navy Yard on 1 August 1911, and was launched on 12 July 1913. It is not known when Nereide was commissioned, but it was most likely after her completion on 20 December 1913. Little is known about Nereides service career in the Règia Marina before August 1915.

Sinking 

After Italy's entry into World War I, the country's armed forces occupied the island of Pelagosa in the central Adriatic. After scouting reports from the German submarine  and from an Austro-Hungarian reconnaissance aircraft reported a French or Italian submarine—which was, in fact, Nereide—at Pelagosa in early August 1915, the Austro-Hungarian Navy dispatched its submarine , under the command of Georg Ritter von Trapp, from nearby Lissa. On the morning of 5 August, Nereide was on the surface, moored under a cliff in the island's harbor.

When U-5 surfaced just offshore, Nereides commanding officer, Capitano di Corvetta Carlo del Greco, cast off the lines and maneuvered to get a shot at von Trapp's boat. Nereide launched a torpedo at U-5 but missed, after which del Greco ordered his boat down. U-5 lined up a shot and launched a single torpedo at the slowly submerging target, striking her, and sending her to the bottom with all hands. Carlo del Greco received the Medaglia d'Oro al Valore Militare for his actions. 
Nereides wreck was located in 1972 at position .

Notes

References

Bibliography

External links
 Nereide Marina Militare website

Italian Nautilus-class submarines
Ships built by Venetian Arsenal
1913 ships
World War I submarines of Italy
Maritime incidents in 1915
Ships sunk by Austro-Hungarian submarines
World War I shipwrecks in the Adriatic Sea
Submarines sunk by submarines